The South Branch Raritan River is a  tributary of the Raritan River in New Jersey.

Description
The source of the South Branch is the outflow from Budd Lake, a glacial remnant located a few miles northeast of Hackettstown.  The river flows out of Morris County, down the middle of Hunterdon County, and along the western edge of Somerset County.

At its end, it forms the border between Branchburg and Hillsborough Townships and, upon reaching the border of Bridgewater Township, joins the North Branch Raritan River to form the Raritan River, which generally flows eastward from that point.  This area where the branches converge was called "Tucca-Ramma-Hacking" by the Lenape meaning the flowing together of water.  It was called "Two Bridges" by the early European settlers, after a set of bridges built in 1733 that met at a small island (the island has washed away over time) on the North Branch.  Today the area is generally referred to as "The Confluence".  In the 1970s, the state discussed plans for a Raritan Confluence Reservoir, which have been shelved due to acquisition costs.

The river’s local grassroots organization is the South Branch Watershed Association. Their mission is to “Protect the Water Resources of the South Branch of the Raritan River and its Watershed”.   Established in 1959, the South Branch Watershed Association is one of the oldest and largest watershed associations in New Jersey, covering 276 square miles, 3 counties and 25 municipalities.  The group offers homeowner well testing, environmental education, river monitoring, annual river cleanup and stream restoration.

Both North and South branches of the Raritan run nearly parallel southwards, east and west of one another, but receive their names from the direction each one flows from at their confluence.

Gallery

Tributaries
Allerton Creek
Assicong Creek
Beaver Brook
Bushkill Brook
Capoolong Creek
Cramers Creek
Drakes Brook
Electric Brook
Holland Brook
Little Brook
Minneaconing Creek
Neshanic River
Pleasant Run (Campbell's Brook)
Prescott Brook
Spruce Run
Mulhockaway Creek
Sidney Brook
Stony Brook (Washington Township - Morris County)
Turkey Brook

See also
 List of rivers of New Jersey
 List of crossings of the Raritan River

References

External links
 
U.S. Geological Survey: NJ stream gaging stations
South Branch Watershed Association

Rivers of Hunterdon County, New Jersey
Rivers of Morris County, New Jersey
Tributaries of the Raritan River
Rivers of New Jersey
Rivers of Somerset County, New Jersey